Peter Michael Heasty Robinson (born 14 October 1929) is a Trinidadian-born English former first-class cricketer.

Robinson was born at Port of Spain and educated in England at Lancing College. He played a single first-class cricket match for L. C. Stevens' XI against Cambridge University at Eastbourne in 1961. Batting twice in the match, he was dismissed in the L. C. Stevens' XI first-innings by Richard Jefferson for 12 runs, while in their second-innings he was dismissed by Peter Brodrick for 7 runs. He also bowled twelve wicketless overs across the match. His son, Jonathan, was also a first-class cricketer.

References

External links

1929 births
Living people
Cricketers from Port of Spain
English sportspeople of Trinidad and Tobago descent
People educated at Lancing College
English cricketers
L. C. Stevens' XI cricketers